Blantyre is a district in the Southern Region of Malawi. The capital is Blantyre, a commercial city where most Malawian industrial and business offices are. The district covers an area of 2,012 km² and has a population of 809,397. It was named after Blantyre, the birth village of David Livingstone in Scotland, one of the first missionary explorers who came to Nyasaland, as Malawi was called before independence in 1964. It is also a main trading point besides the other large cities in Malawi. The other large cities are Lilongwe, which is located in the central region, and Mzuzu, which is in the northern part of Malawi.

Demographics
At the time of the 2018 Census of Malawi, the distribution of the population of Blantyre District by ethnic group was as follows:
 25.5% Ngoni
 22.0% Lomwe
 18.0% Yao
 15.6% Mang'anja
 12.8% Chewa
 3.2% Sena
 1.1% Tumbuka
 0.6% Nyanja
 0.4% Tonga
 0.1% Nkhonde
 0.0% Lambya
 0.0% Sukwa
 0.8% Others

Government and administrative divisions

There are twelve National Assembly constituencies in Blantyre:

 Blantyre - Bangwe
 Blantyre - City East
 Blantyre - City South
 Blantyre - City South East
 Blantyre - City West
 Blantyre - Kabula
 Blantyre - Malabada
 Blantyre - North
 Blantyre - North East
 Blantyre - Rural East
 Blantyre - West
 Blantyre - South West
Elections

Since the 2009 election all of these constituencies have been held by members of the Democratic Progressive Party.

Another election was conducted on 20 May 2014, this was the first tripartite elections where voters chose Councillors, Members of Parliament and President. Professor Arthur Peter Mutharika won with 1,904,399 votes (36.4%).

Towns in Blantyre District
Kabula/Blantyre (capital)
Kanjedza
Chirimba
Chichiri
Kameza
Chileka
Soche
Mpingwe
Chiwembe
Limbe
Bangwe
Machinjiri
Mbayani
Zingwangwa
Lunzu
Ndirande
Nancholi
Chigumula

Main Markets

Limbe market and Blantyre Market are main markets in Blantyre city. Most of the shops are owned by Malawians of Asian origin.

References

 
Districts of Malawi
Districts in Southern Region, Malawi
Blantyre